Danielle Browning (born 29 August 1981) is a retired female track and field sprinter from Jamaica, who specialized in the 200 metres. Her personal best time was 23.21 seconds, achieved in August 2003 in Santo Domingo. She had 11.42 in the 100 metres, achieved in June 2005 in Kingston, Jamaica.

At the 2003 Pan American Games she finished sixth in the 200 metres and won a bronze medal in the 4x100 metre relay. She competed at the 2006 Commonwealth Games without reaching the final.

Achievements

Personal bests
100 metres – 11.42 (2005)
200 metres – 23.21 (2003)

References

1981 births
Living people
Jamaican female sprinters
Athletes (track and field) at the 2003 Pan American Games
Athletes (track and field) at the 2006 Commonwealth Games
World Athletics Championships medalists
Commonwealth Games medallists in athletics
Commonwealth Games gold medallists for Jamaica
Pan American Games medalists in athletics (track and field)
Pan American Games bronze medalists for Jamaica
Medalists at the 2003 Pan American Games
21st-century Jamaican women
Medallists at the 2006 Commonwealth Games